CAPA, Capa or capa may refer to:

People
 Robert Capa (1913–1954), photographer, brother of Cornell Capa
 Cornell Capa (1918–2008), photographer, brother of Robert Capa
 Edson Carlos Santos Lima Junior (born 1988), Brazilian footballer
 Capa, sometimes used as a nickname for José Raúl Capablanca (1888–1942), the Cuban chess world champion

Acronyms
 Canada Agricultural Products Act, Canadian federal legislation
 Canadian Association for Physical Anthropology, based at the University of Western Ontario
 Catholic Association of Performing Arts (UK) (CaAPA); formerly known as the British Catholic Stage Guild
 Certified Automotive Parts Association
 Choice And Partnership Approach, a model for clinical engagement in child psychiatry
 Coalition Against Police Abuse, a community organization in Los Angeles, California
 Columbus Association for the Performing Arts, an arts organization in Columbus, Ohio
 Confederation of Asian and Pacific Accountants
 Corrective and preventive action, cGMP regulatory concept in the pharmaceutical industry
 Council of Australian Postgraduate Associations
 Creative and Performing Arts Program, a magnet program housed at Winston Churchill High School in Livonia, Michigan
 Agence CAPA, a French press agency and production company
 LON-CAPA, a LearningOnline Network with Computer-Assisted Personalized Approach
 Philadelphia High School for the Creative and Performing Arts
 Pittsburgh Creative and Performing Arts School, in downtown Pittsburgh

Other uses
 Capa, South Dakota, a community in the United States
 Robert Capa, a fictional astrophysicist in the 2007 science-fiction film Sunshine
 Capá, a subdivision of Moca, Puerto Rico
 Jyā, koti-jyā and utkrama-jyā (Cāpa), a Sanskrit term for the arc of a circle
 CAPA, a brand name of polycaprolactone

See also
Capra (disambiguation)